Philip Fisher (born 1941) is the Felice Crowl Reid Professor of English and American Literature at Harvard University and an author.

He was a co-winner of the Truman Capote Award for Literary Criticism in 2000 for his book, Still the New World: American Literature in a Culture of Creative Destruction.

He graduated from Harvard University with a M.A. in 1966 and Ph.D. in 1971.  He earned an A.B. in 1963 from the University of Pittsburgh.

Books
The Vehement Passions (2002)
Still the New World: American Literature in a Culture of Creative Destruction (1999)
Wonder, the Rainbow and the Aesthetics of Rare Experiences (1998)
Making and Effacing Art (1991)
Hard Facts (1986)
Making Up Society (1981)

References

Living people
Harvard University faculty
1941 births
20th-century American writers
21st-century American writers
University of Pittsburgh alumni
Harvard University alumni
20th-century American male writers